The word Gan or the initials GAN may refer to:

Places 
Gan, a component of Hebrew placenames literally meaning "garden"

China 
 Gan River (Jiangxi)
 Gan River (Inner Mongolia),
 Gan County, in Jiangxi province
 Gansu, abbreviated Gān (甘), province of China
 Jiangxi, abbreviated Gàn (赣), province of China

Maldives 
 Gan (Addu Atoll)
 Gan (Gaafu Dhaalu Atoll)
 Gan (Huvadhu Atoll)
 Gan (Laamu Atoll)

Elsewhere
 Gáň, a village and municipality in Galanta District, Trnava Region, south-west Slovakia
 Gan Island, an island in the Addu Atoll in the Indian Ocean that used to be an RAF airbase
 Gan, Norway, a village in Lillestrøm municipality, Norway
 Gan, Pyrénées-Atlantiques, a commune in the Pyrénées-Atlantiques département, France

Science and technology 
 GAN (gene)
 Gan (Martian crater)
 Gallium nitride, a popular III-V semiconductor
 Generative adversarial network, a class of machine learning systems
 Generic Access Network, formerly known as Unlicensed Mobile Access (UMA)

People 
 Gan (surname), a surname in various cultures (including a list of people with the surname)
Gamal Abdel Nasser (1918–1970), president of Egypt
 Gösta Adrian-Nilsson (1884–1965), Swedish painter, signature "GAN"

Fictional characters 
 Gan (Stephen King), in King's Dark Tower novel series
 Gan Isurugi, in the Rival Schools video game series
 Olag Gan, in the Blake's 7 television series and franchise

Other 
 GAN (cycling team), the former name of the Crédit Agricole cycling team
 Gan Chinese-speaking people
 Gan Chinese, a variety of spoken Chinese
 Gan International Airport, IATA code
 Global Apprenticeships Network, a not-for-profit association based in Geneva
 Global Arab Network, a London-based news service about the Arab world
 Grant Anticipation Note, a type of highway financing
 Great American Novel, commonly abbreviated as GAN
 GANCUBE (or GAN), Chinese speedcube manufacturer

See also 

 
 
 
 Bryan McGan (1848–1894), Australian cricketer
 Gahan
 Gahn
 Ghan (disambiguation)
 Gann (disambiguation)